Fungus Among Us or Fungus Amongus, or Fungus Amungus may refer to:

Music
 Fungus Amongus, a 1995 album by American rock band Incubus
 HumungousFungusAmongus, a 1986 album by hardcore punk band Adrenalin O.D.

Radio
 "Fungus Amungus", a Radiolab episode

Television
 "Fungus Among Us", a SpongeBob SquarePants episode
 "Fungus Among Us", a  Milo Murphy's Law episode
 "Fungus Amongus", a Darkwing Duck episode
 "Fungus Amungus", the pilot of Groundling Marsh